Matteo da Perugia (fl. 1400–1416) was a Medieval Italian composer, presumably from Perugia. From 1402 to 1407 he was the first magister cappellae of the Milan Cathedral; his duties included being cantor and teaching three boys selected by the Cathedral deputies.

Life and career
Little is known about his life apart from this. Willi Apel asserted that he was the principal composer of his generation, but this claim was challenged by Heinrich Besseler, and Matteo's historical position remains an open question. Neither has there yet been a thorough stylistic study of his compositions. He wrote many contra-tenors to existing works, which resulted in many of these being wrongly ascribed to him. Matteo wrote in many forms, including the virelai, the ballade, and the rondeau. One of his patrons was Antipope Alexander V.

References

Sources
Günther, Ursula, and Anne Stone. "Matteo da Perugia", Grove Music Online, ed. L. Macy (accessed December 29, 2005), grovemusic.com (subscription access).
 

Italian male classical composers
Trecento composers
15th-century Italian composers
Medieval male composers